Milataxel (MAC-321, TL-139) is a taxol analog.

References

Taxanes
Tert-butyl compounds
Acetate esters
2-Furyl compounds
Benzoate esters